The 1931 Cincinnati Bearcats football team was an American football team that represented the University of Cincinnati as a member of the Buckeye Athletic Association during the 1931 college football season. In their first season under head coach Dana M. King, the Bearcats compiled a 5–4 record (2–1 against conference opponents).

Schedule

References

Cincinnati
Cincinnati Bearcats football seasons
Cincinnati Bearcats football